Hans Schmaus (22 May 1862 in Munich – 4 December 1905 in Munich) was a German pathologist.

In 1887 he obtained his doctorate at the University of Munich, where he spent the next several years as an assistant to Otto Bollinger at the institute of pathology. In 1889 he became habilitated for pathology, becoming an associate professor at Munich in 1899.

At Munich, he performed studies involving the pathological anatomy of the spinal cord, and did research of hyaline degeneration and caseous necrosis. With pathologist Eugen Albrecht, he conducted studies of coagulative necrosis.

Published works 
He was the author of Grundriss der pathologischen Anatomie, a book that was issued in several editions and published in English as "A Text-book of Pathology and Pathological Anatomy", (translation by James Ewing; Lea brothers & Company, 1902). Other noteworthy efforts by Schmaus include:
 Zur Kenntniss der diffuser Hirnsklerose, 1888 - Towards the understanding of diffuse cerebral sclerosis.
 Die Kompressions-Myelitis bei Karies der Wirbelsäule, 1890 - On compression-myelitis in caries of the spine.
 Beiträge zur pathologischen Anatomie der Rückenmarkserschütterung, 1890  - Contribution to the pathological anatomy of spinal cord concussions.
 Über den Ausgang der cyanotischen Induration der Niere in Granularatrophie, 1893 - On cyanotic induration of the kidney in granular atrophy.
 Zur Frage der Coagulations nekrose (with Eugen Albrecht), 1899 - On coagulative necrosis.

References 

1862 births
1905 deaths
Physicians from Munich
Academic staff of the Ludwig Maximilian University of Munich
Ludwig Maximilian University of Munich alumni
German pathologists